Kerry Gai Chant  is a public health physician who has been the Chief Health Officer of New South Wales, Australia, since 2008. She gained prominence during the COVID-19 pandemic providing regular public health advice for New South Wales, a contribution for which she was named the state's Woman of the Year in March 2021.

Early life
Chant grew up in Punchbowl, New South Wales. She attended the Danebank Anglican School for Girls, graduating in 1980. Chant worked in retail jobs and a pharmacy before studying medicine. She attended the University of New South Wales where she completed a Bachelor of Medicine, Bachelor of Surgery in 1987, a Master in Health Administration in 1991 and a Master of Public Health in 1995.

Career
Chant has been with the New South Wales Health Department since 1991 working in the areas of virus infections, communicable diseases prevention and control and Indigenous health. She is currently the Deputy Secretary, Population and Public Health and Chief Health Officer. Prior to this, Chant was Director, Public Health Unit in Sydney South West Area Health Service; Director, Health Protection and Deputy Chief Health Officer. In 2013, she was threatened for advocating fluoridation of the water supply in the City of Lismore. During the state's response to the COVID-19 pandemic, Chant often appeared alongside premier Gladys Berejiklian when providing health updates and advice to the public.

Awards
 2021: NSW Premier's Woman of the Year, and Woman of Excellence Award
 2020: UNSW Chancellor's Award for Exceptional Alumni Achievement
 2015: Australian Public Service Medal for "outstanding public service to population health in New South Wales"
 2022: Appointed Officer of the Order of Australia in the 2022 Queen's Birthday Honours for "distinguished service to the people of New South Wales through public health administration and governance, and to medicine".

References

External links 
 

Australian women epidemiologists
Australian medical doctors
Australian public servants
Australian women medical doctors
Living people
Officers of the Order of Australia
Place of birth missing (living people)
University of New South Wales alumni
Recipients of the Public Service Medal (Australia)
Year of birth missing (living people)